Bagdadia irakella is a moth in the family Gelechiidae. It was described by Hans Georg Amsel in 1949. It is found in Iraq.

References

Bagdadia
Moths described in 1949
Taxa named by Hans Georg Amsel